Yang Dejiang (born 31 August 2004) is a Chinese footballer currently playing as a midfielder for Guangzhou.

Career statistics

Club
.

References

2004 births
Living people
Sportspeople from Shenzhen
Footballers from Guangdong
Chinese footballers
China youth international footballers
Association football midfielders
Chinese Super League players
Guangzhou F.C. players